Vas is a settlement with a compact core on the left bank of the Drava River and extending into the hills towards Remšnik to the north in the Municipality of Radlje ob Dravi in Slovenia.

References

External links
Vas on Geopedia

Populated places in the Municipality of Radlje ob Dravi